Hassanein is an Arabic surname. Notable people with the name include:

Ali Hassanein or Ali Hussnein aka Ali Sadiq Hussnein, (1925–2018), Libyan politician
Ali Hassanein (actor) (1939–2015), Egyptian actor
Ahmed Hassanein Pasha (1889–1946), or Aḥmad Moḥammad Makhlūf Ḥasanēn al-Būlākī, Egyptian courtier, diplomat, Olympic athlete in fencing, photographer, writer, politician and explorer, tutor then chamberlain to King Farouk
Hassan Hassanein (1916–1957), Egyptian golfer
Mohamed Hassanein Heikal (1923–2016), Egyptian journalist
Mohamed Hassanein (born 1913), Egyptian swimmer
Muhammad Hassanein, Egyptian politician and government minister
Mustafa Hassanein aka Mustafa Mohammad (born 1968), IFBB professional bodybuilder